Boloraberd may refer to:

Boloraberd, Armenia, a village in the Vayots Dzor Province
Boloraberd Fortress, a fortress also known as Proshaberd